Matteo Maria Boiardo (144019/20 December 1494) was an Italian Renaissance poet, best known for his epic poem Orlando innamorato.

Early life
Boiardo was born in 1440, at or near, Scandiano (today's province of Reggio Emilia); the son of Giovanni di Feltrino and Lucia Strozzi, he was of noble lineage, ranking as Count of Scandiano, with seignorial power over Arceto, Casalgrande, Gesso, and Torricella. Boiardo was an ideal example of a gifted and accomplished courtier, possessing both a gallant heart and deep humanistic learning.

At an early age he entered the University of Ferrara, where he acquired a good knowledge of Greek and Latin, and even of the Oriental languages. He was in due time admitted doctor in philosophy and in law.

Career

Up to the year of his marriage to Taddea Gonzaga, the daughter of the Count of Novellara (1472), he had received many marks of favour from Borso d'Este, Duke of Ferrara, having been sent to meet Frederick III (1469), and afterwards visiting Pope Paul II (1471) in the train of Borso. In 1473 he joined the retinue which escorted Eleonora of Aragon, the daughter of Ferdinand I, to meet her spouse, Ercole, at Ferrara. Five years later Boiardo was invested with the governorship of Reggio, an office which he filled with noted success till his death, except for a brief interval (1481–86) when he was governor of Modena.

Writing
In his youth Boiardo had been a successful imitator of Petrarch's love poems. More serious attempts followed with the Istoria Imperiale, some adaptations of Nepos, Apuleius, Herodotus, Xenophon, etc., and his Eclogues. These were followed by a comedy, Il Timone (1487?). He is best remembered, however, for his grandiose poem of chivalry and romance Orlando innamorato (the Encyclopædia Britannica Eleventh Edition provides a detailed discussion of Orlando in its several editions). Rime, another work from 1499, was largely forgotten until the English-Italian librarian Antonio Panizzi published it in 1835.

Almost all Boiardo's works, and especially the Orlando innamorato, were composed for the amusement of Duke Ercole and his court, though not written within its precincts. His practice, it is said, was to retire to Scandiano or some other of his estates, and there to devote himself to composition, and historians state that he took care to insert in the descriptions of his poem those of the agreeable environs of his château, and that the greater part of the names of his heroes, as Mandricardo, Gradasse, Sacripant, Agramant and others, were merely the names of some of his peasants, which, from their uncouthness, appeared to him proper to be given to Saracen warriors.

Tarot
It is uncertain when Boiardo wrote a poem about a self-composed, unusual Tarot game (Tarocchi), which is of relevance to Tarot research of the 15th century and the question of when Tarot developed. A deck, which was produced according to the poem (probably shortly after Boiardo's death), has partially survived.

References

External links

 
 
 Boiardo's influence on the early Tarot game inclusive an extensive time line of Boiardo's life

1440 births
1494 deaths
Italian poets
Italian male poets
Italian Renaissance writers
People from the Province of Reggio Emilia
Tarot card games
15th-century Italian poets
Italian-language poets
Epic poets